The 2nd Workers' Cultural Palace Station or Shiergong Station is a station on Line 2 of the Guangzhou Metro. It is situated underground at the junction of Jiangnan Avenue and Tongfu Road in the Haizhu District and began operation on 29December 2002. The streets of the local area are noted for selling wedding dresses.

References

Railway stations in China opened in 2002
Guangzhou Metro stations in Haizhu District